The Farmington Historic Downtown Commercial District is a  historic district in Farmington, New Mexico, United States, that is listed on the National Register of Historic Places (NFRP).

Description
The dixtrict is approximately eight blocks, along Main Street and Broadway, from Auburn Avenue to Miller Avenue  It includes 62 contributing buildings and one contributing site, as well as 37 non-contributing buildings.

One of the older business block buildings is the Falling Waters building, a two-part building built in 1907 with modifications in the 1920s and 1930s.

The district was listed on the NRHP December 20, 2002.

Notable buildings

See also

 National Register of Historic Places listings in San Juan County, New Mexico

References

External links

National Register of Historic Places in San Juan County, New Mexico
Italianate architecture in New Mexico

Buildings and structures completed in 1923
Farmington, New Mexico
Historic districts on the National Register of Historic Places in New Mexico